Club Cerro Porteño PF is a Paraguayan football club based in the city of Presidente Franco in the Alto Paraná Department. The club plays in the Primera B Nacional.

The club was founded 12 August 1967. Their home games are played at the Cerro Porteño stadium  which has a capacity of approximately 5,000 seats.

They wear the same colors as the traditional Paraguayan team Cerro Porteño, and since its foundation, did not compete in the Paraguayan First Division until the 2012 season.

Current squad 2012

Notable players
To appear in this section a player must have either:
 Played at least 125 games for the club.
 Set a club record or won an individual award while at the club.
 Been part of a national team at any time.
 Played in the first division of any other football association (outside of Paraguay).
 Played in a continental and/or intercontinental competition.

1980s
 Ninguno
1990s
 Francisco Aldo Barreto Miranda (1999–2003, 2014−2015)
2000s
 Christian Ovelar (2003–2007, 2013)
 Wilson Méndez (2003–2004, 2015)
2010s
 Fabián Balbuena (2010−2012)
 Rogerio Leichtweis (2012)
 Nelson Figueredo (2012)
 Benito Montalvo (2012)
 Ariel Andrusyszyn (2012−2013)
 Adán dos Santos (2013)
 Fabiano Heves (2013)
 Martín Tenemás (2013)
 Elías Moreira (2013−)
  Jersi Socola (2014)
 Wilbert Fernandez (2015−)
 Wuiwel Isea (2015−)
 Ángel Núñez (−2016)

Non-CONMEBOL players
  Hiroki Uchida (2013)
  Mike Gamboa (2014)

Honours
División Intermedia:
2011

Paraguayan Third Division:
2002

References

External links
Cerro Porteño PF Info

Cerro Porteno PF
Alto Paraná Department
Association football clubs established in 1967
1967 establishments in Paraguay